Rok Studios is a Nigerian film production company.  Its production studios is based in Anthony Village, Lagos. The company was founded in August 2013 by Mary Remmy Njoku. In addition to its numerous films, Rok Studios has produced over 12 TV series.

Notable productions from Rok Studios include: Hazeezat (2014), Thy Will Be Done, Festac Town,–TV Series (2014), and A Northern Affair (2014) (all of which were produced by Mary Njoku).

Mary Njoku launched ROK on Sky, a network airing across the UK at the Nigerian High Commission in the UK in 2016.

In July 2019, ROK was acquired by Canal+ Group. Mary Njoku stays on as director general of ROK under the Canal+ acquisition.

On 23 November 2022, ROK United Kingdom launched a streamed service on Freeview channel 280.

2013–2014 releases

2015–2017 releases

References

StudioCanal
Nigerian film studios
Companies based in Lagos
Film production companies of Nigeria